Rumble on 44th Street was a professional wrestling event produced by New Japan Pro-Wrestling (NJPW). It took place on October 28, 2022, in New York City at the Palladium Times Square. The event was preceded by a Halloween inspired event named The Night Before Rumble on 44th Street on October 27.

Storylines
Rumble on 44th Street featured professional wrestling matches that involve different wrestlers from pre-existing scripted feuds and storylines. Wrestlers portrayed villains, heroes, or less distinguishable characters in the scripted events that built tension and culminated in a wrestling match or series of matches.

Event
A supplemental show, entitled The Night Before Rumble on 44th Street: A Halloween Special, as the name implies, was held the night before the main show on October 27, 2022. No matches were deliberately announced in advance to keep the show a mystery for fans. The show featured many surprises, such as a reunion of the Forever Hooligans tag team as Alex Koslov came out of retirement for one night only, Strong Openweight Champion Fred Rosser facing off against former World Championship Wrestling wrestler Crowbar, and a 12-man elimination tag team match in the main event, featuring the likes of IWGP World Heavyweight Champion Jay White, Kazuchika Okada, Homicide, and wrestlers from All Elite Wrestling, such as Eddie Kingston and AEW World Champion Jon Moxley.

The event hosted the presence of several World Wonder Ring Stardom wrestlers. The pre-show of the event saw Cosmic Angels unit members Mina Shirakawa and Waka Tsukiyama unsuccessfully challenging Kylie Rae and Tiara James. Stars unit leader Mayu Iwatani successfully defended the SWA World Championship against KiLynn King. In the second match, Yujiro Takahashi and Sho defeated Rocky Romero and Yoh. After the match, Lio Rush showed up to help the Chaos members. Alex Coughlin returned after the second match and announced his participation in the World Tag League. Ken Shamrock escorted Clark Connors to the ring. A staredown ensued between the two Pancrase legends following Suzuki's win. In the end, however, the two hugged.

Results

References

2022 in New York City
2022 in professional wrestling
Events in New York City
New Japan Pro-Wrestling shows
Professional wrestling in New York City